Bari( Rawat,Rotella,Thakur)one of the  Kshatriya Snatan Hindu Clan of India. They are mostly spread across Northern India. are mostly spread across Northern India. 

status.

The community get their name from the Sanskrit word vari meaning water. According to their traditions they were the lordsof the waterways. The Bari are likely to be sub-group of the Kewat community. They claim descent from Kirat Bari, an soldier in the army of Maharana Pratap. The community is now found mainly in eastern and southern Uttar Pradesh, and speak the Awadhi dialect. Bari were also known as Sharaswat Brahmins in the era of Lord Sri Ram of Ayodhya. They use to cook food for lord Sri Ram and called as “Bar”.They are known to be very trustworthy with the Kings and they are very trustworthy for their owners. In the history of Rajut they lost life for their king in the battlefield. They also claim descent from Rupan Bari, an soldier in the army of Alha udal. Rupan Bari details available in the fold song called Alha and very popular in Southern Uttar Pradesh.Bari spent many year in forest because of fear of killings by Mugals and their subordinates in India. They adopted business of leaves and started making “leaf crockery” for their livehood. Bari also do trading of PAN laves in state like Maharashtra and Madhya Pradesh.

Most of Bari people now marching ahead with the progress and now the y are found in Government Services, business and other services. Bari people are now focused on education and their generations are now well educated and claim themselves as “kshtriaya” . Most of bari people are now in business and working with other business communities like Agarwal and Baniya. Bari classified as Other Backward classes” in Uttar Pradesh, Haryana and Delhi. The community use the surname i.e Bari, Rawat , Rawal, Singh & Thakur. They are also very close to “Tamboli” and Baria Community of other state. In Orrissa they are classified in Sc/st category due to there political view.

References

Social groups of Odisha
Social groups of Rajasthan
Social groups of Bihar
Social groups of Maharashtra
Social groups of Jharkhand
Social groups of Chhattisgarh
Scheduled Castes
Social groups of Uttar Pradesh
Social groups of Madhya Pradesh